Philippe-Louis-Marc-Antoine, comte de Noailles, prince-duc de Poix, and 2nd Spanish and 1st French duc de Mouchy (21 November or 21 December 175217 February 1819), was a French soldier, and politician of the Revolution.

Biography
The son of Philippe de Noailles and grandson of Adrien-Maurice, 3rd duc de Noailles, he was born on 21 November 1752
 and held the courtesy title of prince de Poix as a child.

He was married to Anne Louise Marie de Beauvau known as Mademoiselle de Beauvau (1 April 175020 November 1834) only child of Charles Juste de Beauvau and Marie Charlotte de La Tour d'Auvergne (who in turn was a daughter of Emmanuel Théodose de La Tour d'Auvergne and his last wife Louise Henriette Francoise de Lorraine). He had two sons, Charles Arthur Tristan Languedoc de Noailles and Just de Noailles.

The French revolution 
In 1789 he was elected to the Estates-General by the noblesse of Amiens and Ham, but was compelled to resign in consequence of a duel with the commander of the National Guard of Versailles.

He left the country for some time, but returned to France and took part in the riots of August, 1792. He was, however, forced to quit the country once more to evade the fate of his father and mother, guillotined in 1794. On his father's death, he acceded à brevêt to the titles of comte de Noailles and duc de Poix, as well as to the Spanish title duc de Mouchy.

Returning to France in 1800, with the amnesty of Émigrés, he lived quietly at his residence in Mouchy-le-Châtel (Oise) during the Empire. After the Bourbon Restoration, he again came into favor and in 1817 was created duc de Mouchy as a French title, thus becoming a Peer of France. He died at Paris on 17 February 1819.

A comedy dedicated to Monseigneur the Poix
The false magic, comedy in one act presented for the first time on the theatre of the Italian Comedy, Wednesday 1 February 1775, is dedicated to Monseigneur the Poix, which shows us the shape of his character.  The prince de Poix attends the salon of the countess d'Angivillers, wife of Charles-Claude Flahaut de la Billaderie, comte d'Angiviller, this woman enchanteresse, Mrs Necker. The court there meets with the French Academy, and people of arts and letters: Diderot, d'Alembert, Jean-François de la Harpe, Charles Pinot Duclos, Jean-François Marmontel, Jacques-Henri Bernardin de Saint-Pierre.

The prince de Poix, in love with one of the chambermaids of the Queen, attends the coterie of Madam d'Angivilliers<ref>Rambaud, Guy of, For the love of Dauphin, p. 53</ref> and benefits from it to meet this young graduate in this living room of the street of the Oratory, in Paris.  He is not a husband as sedentary as his vénérable'' father statement he goes elsewhere to separate from its wife.

References

Attribution:

Princes of Poix
Dukes of Noailles
102
Dukes of Poix
Philippe Louis Marc Antoine
Philippe Louis
People of the French Revolution
1752 births
1819 deaths
Members of the Chamber of Peers of the Bourbon Restoration
Knights of the Golden Fleece of Spain